The 2013 Mid-Eastern Athletic Conference baseball tournament began on May 15 and ended on May 19 at Marty L. Miller Field, on the campus of Norfolk State University in Norfolk, Virginia.  It was an eight-team double elimination tournament.  South Division top seed  won their first tournament championship to claim the Mid-Eastern Athletic Conference's automatic bid to the 2013 NCAA Division I baseball tournament.  The Tigers defeated Bethune-Cookman, who had claimed thirteen of the fourteen tournament championships, with North Carolina A&T winning the other.

Format and seeding
The four teams in the North Division and top four finishers from the South Division were seeded one through four based on regular season records, with first round matchups of the top seed from the North and the fourth seed from the South, the second seed from the North against the third seed from the South, and so on.  The winners advanced in the winners' bracket, while first round losers played elimination games.  The format means that one team from the South, Florida A&M, was not in the field.  Savannah State claimed the top seed from the South over Bethune-Cookman by tiebreaker.

Bracket

* - Indicates game required 13 innings.† - Indicates game required 10 innings.

All-Tournament Team
The following players were named to the All-Tournament Team.

Outstanding Performer
Kyle McGowin was named Outstanding Performer of the Tournament.  McGowin was a pitcher for Savannah State, who threw all ten innings of the championship and recorded 11 strikeouts.

References

Mid-Eastern Athletic Conference Baseball Tournament
Mid-Eastern Athletic Conference baseball tournament
Tournament
Mid-Eastern Athletic Conference Baseball
Baseball in Virginia
College sports in Virginia
Sports in Norfolk, Virginia